Leavenworth Times is an American daily newspaper published in Leavenworth, Kansas. The newspaper is owned by Gannett.

Founded in 1856 by future United States Senator Robert Crozier, the Times claims to be the oldest daily newspaper in Kansas. Daniel R. Anthony, brother of Susan B. Anthony, bought the paper in 1871 and the paper remained in the Anthony family until the 1960s, even after Daniel Anthony shot and killed rival publisher R.C. Satterlee of the Kansas Herald, in 1871 (he was acquitted at trial), and then was shot himself by rival editor William Embry of the Daily Appeal in 1875 (he survived).

In 1966, The Thomson Corporation bought the Leavenworth Times, selling it in 1995 to American Publishing Company (later Hollinger International). During Hollinger's divestment of most of its small papers, Liberty Publishing (later called GateHouse Media) bought the Times in 1999.

The Times is one of two daily newspapers GateHouse owns in the Kansas City metropolitan area, along with The Examiner across the river in Independence, Missouri. GateHouse also publishes two weekly newspapers alongside the Times, The Fort Leavenworth Lamp at Fort Leavenworth and Lansing This Week in Lansing, Kansas.

See also
 List of newspapers in Kansas

References

External links
 Official site

Newspapers published in Kansas
Leavenworth County, Kansas
Publications established in 1856
Gannett publications